Gachi District is a district (bakhsh) in Malekshahi County, Ilam Province, Iran. At the 2006 census, its population was 13,067.  The District has two cities: Delgosha & Mehr. The District has one rural district (dehestan): Gachi Rural District.

References 

Districts of Ilam Province
Malekshahi County